Pierre Dominique Gaisseau was a French documentary film-maker best known for his documentary Sky Above and Mud Beneath, which was awarded the first Oscar for a documentary.  The film is an account of an expedition into the previously unexplored wilds of the Netherlands New Guinea accomplished in 1959 by a small team of French and Dutch explorers under Gaisseau's leadership, in the area where young Michael Rockefeller later disappeared.  The film's images of stone age life and mock birth rituals made indelible imprints on the Western mind, repeated in various art and theater forms.

Gaisseau's films were not limited to remote areas. "Only One New York" contained intimate glimpses of New York City's Roma subculture.  After completing a best selling autobiography "Vivre Pour Voir", Gaisseau died in Paris in 1997 of a heart attack. His widow, Kyoko, died in Paris in 2010.

Family

Gaisseau's first wife was Anne Marie Fichter with whom he had two children, Catherine and Nicolas. This marriage ended in divorce, and he subsequently married Kyoko Kosaka, with whom he had a daughter, Akiko Gaisseau.

External links
 Forêt sacrée: magie et rites secrets des Toma webGuinée

 Profile of Pierre Gaisseau from the Association for Cultural Equity
 Audio archives of Pierre-Dominique Gaisseau Unpublished and published audio records collected by Pierre-Dominique Gaisseau (or in collaboration with him) in Africa (Ogooue-Congo Expedition 1946, French Guinea 1952-1953), in South America (Orenoque-Amazone Expedition 1948-1950) and in Papua New Guinea (1952-1957 ?), archives preserved by the French Centre de Recherche en Ethnomusicologie

1997 deaths
French cinematographers
French documentary filmmakers
Year of birth missing